Il cantante mascherato is an Italian reality singing competition television series part of the Masked Singer franchise. It premiered on Rai 1 on 10 January 2020.

Production
On 9 July 2019, it was announced that Rai 1 and Endemol Shine Italy were producing a local version of the Fox reality singing competition, The Masked Singer, which itself is based on the Munhwa Broadcasting Corporation singing competition, King of Mask Singer.

Panelists and host

Following the announcement, it was confirmed by Rai 1 through the official Instagram account of the program, that the judging panel would consist of musician, TV presenter and producer Francesco Facchinetti, TV presenter and comedian Flavio Insinna, fashion designer Guillermo Mariotto (who is also a judge on Ballando con le Stelle), actress Ilenia Pastorelli, and singer Patty Pravo. It was also confirmed that Milly Carlucci would host the show, acting also as art director. In Season 2, Guillermo Mariotto and Ilenia Pastorelli were replaced by Costantino della Gherardesca and Caterina Balivo as members of the jury. During season 2 Al Bano appeared as a guest panellist in episode 3.

Series overview

Season 1 (2020)

 Al Bano later appeared as the Sunflower on the Spanish version of the show, Mask Singer: Adivina quién canta, where he placed 5th. He is the first person ever to appear on The Masked Singer in two different countries. On Il cantante mascherato, he was also the first person on a non-Asian version to perform their own songs, singing his 1996 song È la mia vita in Week 2, and his 1967 song Nel sole in Week 3 (as a medley with Adriano Pappalardo's Ricominciamo).

Week 1 (10 January)

Week 2 (17 January)

Week 3 (24 January) - Semi-final

Week 4 (31 January) - Final

Season 2 (2021)

Week 1 (29 January)

Week 2 (5 February)

Week 3 (12 February)

Round One

Round Two

Week 4 (19 February) - Semi-final

Round One

Round Two

Week 5 (26 February) - Final

Season 3 (2022)

Week 1 (11 February)

Week 2 (18 February)

Week 3 (4 March)

Week 4 (11 March)

Week 5 (18 March)

Week 6 (25 March) - Semi-final

Week 7 (1 April) - Final

Season 4 (2023)

See also
 Masked Singer franchise

References

Italian music television series
Italian reality television series
Italian game shows
Italian television series based on South Korean television series
Masked Singer
RAI original programming